The 1999 Indian general election polls in United Andhra Pradesh were held for 42 seats in the state. The result was a landslide victory for the National Democratic Alliance and its ally Telugu Desam Party, which together won 36 out of 42 seats.

Voting and results

Results by Alliance

 TDP had seat-sharing agreements with the BJP.

List of elected members

External links
 Website of Election Commission of India
 CNN-IBN Lok Sabha Election History

Indian general elections in Andhra Pradesh
1990s in Andhra Pradesh
1999 Indian general election